Nahr-e Rahmeh (also Romanized as Nahr-e Raḩmeh) is a village in Abshar Rural District, in the Central District of Shadegan County, Khuzestan Province, Iran. At the 2006 census, its population was 481, in 103 families.

References 

Populated places in Shadegan County